Why Not? with Shania Twain is an American docuseries series starring Canadian country music singer/songwriter Shania Twain. It premiered on the Oprah Winfrey Network on May 8, 2011. The series is a look at Twain's career, including her upbringing, as well as the musical hiatus she underwent during the first decade of the 21st century.

Content
The show covers details in the life and career of Shania Twain, a Canadian country music singer. Elements in the show's arc include her divorce from longtime husband and producer Robert John "Mutt" Lange, as well as the vocal cord issues which temporarily ended her ability to sing.

Critical reception
David Knowles of The Hollywood Reporter gave the show a mixed review, stating that it was "a sometimes compelling, sometimes turgid program that feels equal parts emotional rescue and public relations coup."

Episodes

References

External links
 
 

2010s American reality television series
2011 American television series debuts
2011 American television series endings
Oprah Winfrey Network original programming
English-language television shows
Shania Twain